Paddy McCormack (born 1939 in Rhode, County Offaly) is an Irish retired sportsperson.  He played Gaelic football with his local club Rhode and was a member of the Offaly senior inter-county team from 1958 until 1972.

References

1939 births
Living people
Rhode Gaelic footballers
Offaly inter-county Gaelic footballers